Otus is an educational technology company providing a learning management system, data warehouse and many classroom management tools for K-12 students, teachers, parents, and administrators. Otus was nominated as a finalist of two 2016 Codie awards in the "Best Classroom Management System" and "Best K-12 Course or Learning Management Solution" categories, one 2018 Codie award for "Best Student Assessment Solution", and two 2019 Codie awards for "Best Data Solution" and "Best Administrative Solution". Otus was a finalist in EdTech Digest's 2016 "District Data Solution" and "Learning Management System" categories. Otus co-founder Chris Hull was also announced as one of the National School Boards Association's "20 to Watch Educators for 2016".

History
Founded in 2012 by Chris Hull and Pete Helfers, two social studies teachers at Illinois' Elm Place Middle School, Otus was designed to replicate the ideal K-12 classroom experience that the two teachers envisioned. After receiving a grant to bring 1:1 computing iPads to their students, both quickly recognized the limitless potential that classroom management tools offer, but were disappointed with the effectiveness of the current apps on the market. Believing that they could do better, Chris and Pete started to develop Otus while continuing to work their respective teaching jobs, their end-goal being to create an all in one classroom management system integrating everything necessary to run a classroom. After reaching out to Chicago-based hedge fund manager Andy Bluhm, who provided them with $2M in funding, Otus was officially launched in August, 2014 and has grown domestically and internationally since. As of May 10, 2016, Otus owns the trademark phrase "Student Performance Platform." Otus has recently partnered with NWEA to become a MAP (Measures of Academic Progress) Authorized Data Partner. Starting Fall 2016, all users of Otus will be able to see and take advantage of MAP data directly in the Otus platform.

Functions
Otus competes with other learning management systems such as Edmodo, Blackboard Learn, Schoology, Moodle and Canvas by Instructure to provide educational tools on a district and school wide basis. Otus in particular aims to offer "everything a mobile classroom could possibly need for both teachers and students" and does so by providing attendance tracking, a digital bookshelf for uploading files, in-app annotations, assignments, papers, polls, blogs, quizzes, and more. Otus integrates third-party apps, such as Khan Academy, PARCC, and many more through their "toolbox" program. Everything a student does through the Otus platform is integrated into a deep learning program called "analytics" on the Otus app, which compiles information from all first- and third-party apps and creates a student profile easily accessible by teachers and parents at the teacher's discretion. Otus is freely available for use by students, teachers, and parents, but requires a subscription fee for district administrators. Otus is available on iOS for teachers and students, and the web for all users.

References

External links 

Educational technology companies of the United States
Internet properties established in 2012
Companies based in Chicago
IOS software
Classroom management software